Cone of Silence (also known as Trouble in the Sky in the United States) is a 1960 British drama film directed by Charles Frend and starring Michael Craig, Peter Cushing, George Sanders, and Bernard Lee. The film is about the investigation into a series of crashes involving the fictional 'Atlas Aviation Phoenix' jetliner. Cone of Silence is based upon the novel of that name by David Beaty, which is loosely based on the 1952 crash in Rome and subsequent investigations into the structural integrity of the de Havilland Comet airliner.

The title refers to a technical term used in the Low-frequency radio range.  An identification of a range's cone of silence is shown early in the film.

Plot
Captain George Gort (Bernard Lee) is a pilot for British Empire Airways, flying their route London – Rome – Cairo – Ranjibad – Calcutta – Singapore. He is found to have been at fault after his Phoenix 1 jetliner crashed on takeoff from (the fictional) Ranjibad airport, killing his co-pilot. He is accused of rotating too early, increasing drag to such an extent that the aircraft could not achieve flying speed.

Gort is reprimanded and reduced in seniority but is allowed to return to flying the Phoenix after a check flight under Captain Hugh Dallas (Michael Craig). Meanwhile, Gort's daughter Charlotte (Elizabeth Seal) refuses to believe he was at fault. Gort's flying skills are again called into question when a piece of hedge is found wrapped around an undercarriage leg after an unusually low approach to Calcutta, although this appears to have been caused by a nervous Captain Clive Judd (Peter Cushing) who was in the cockpit to assess Gort's flying on that route and lowered the flaps too soon.

Gort is ultimately unable to prevent another crash of the Phoenix aircraft at Ranjibad in similar circumstances to the previous one, and this time he dies along with an unstated number of passengers and crew. Later, Dallas is informed by another pilot that in fact there is no hedge at the threshold of the Calcutta runway and that the piece of hedge found in the undercarriage of Gort's flight must have come from Ranjibad, where the take-off had been flown by Judd. Dallas then discovers that the aircraft's designer had possibly withheld information on potential take-off difficulties in hot conditions. A third crash at Ranjibad is avoided by seconds when a message from the aircraft designer comes through to a crew about to take off in the same problematic weather conditions, advising them to add eight knots to the calculated unstick speed and keep the nose-wheel on the ground until just before unstick speed is reached. The take off is successful, and Gort is exonerated posthumously.

Cast
As appearing in screen credits (main roles identified):

Production
Cone of Silence was based on David Beaty's novel, Cone of Silence (1959). Beaty was an ex-military and commercial pilot with BOAC who became an expert on human error in aviation incidents and accidents. After beginning a writing career with his first novels revolving around aviation themes, Beaty went back to college to get his degree in psychology and became a civil servant in 1967. He wrote his first non-fiction work, The Human Factor in Aircraft Accidents, in 1969, and followed that with other works before he returned to the subject of his first non-fiction book in The Naked Pilot: The Human Factor in Aircraft Accidents (1991). The film Cone of Silence represented his concern that human factors were being ignored in the aviation industry.

Budgetary constraints led to the production using miniatures to depict airfields and aircraft, although principal photography took place at Filton Airport in North Bristol with the cooperation of the Bristol Siddeley Engines Ltd. (BSEL). The majority of the film was shot on the sound stages at Shepperton Studios, Shepperton, Surrey, United Kingdom. 

Aubrey Baring provided £16,060 to the budget.

Representation of the 'Phoenix' in the film
The 'Phoenix' airliner is represented by the Avro Ashton WB493, in use since 1955 as a testbed by the engine manufacturer Bristol Siddeley (now part of Rolls-Royce plc). The real aircraft, named the 'Olympus-Ashton', was powered by two Olympus turbojet, podded, underwing engines in addition to four Nenes mounted in the standard wing root location. For its starring role as the 'Phoenix' airliner, the Olympus-Ashton was painted in a special livery to represent the fictional 'Atlas Aviation'. It was the only full-scale aircraft seen in the film.

Reception

Box office
Cone of Silence lost Bryanston £32,348.

Critical
After its premiere in London, reviews of the Cone of Silence were generally positive. Gerard Schurmann's film score was notable "...film music which divorces it from the routine and the prosaic ... the scores are infused with a dynamism, an energy, which is not only compelling but impelling, the music always a cogent force on the soundtrack, driving all before it." The authoritative Flight magazine concentrated on the aviation elements, stating, "Coming at a time when jet runway lengths, ground stall effects and unstick manual speeds are again under close review, this is a timely and exciting film; no pilot could see it without mentally following through every action of each take-off and landing sequence."

Other reviewers were less impressed. "Somewhat talky with a lot of technical jargon thrown into the screenplay (based on actual events),  ... a fairly straightforward drama aided by a top notch cast of familiar Brit character actors." "This average drama has simplistic characterizations and poorly written dialogue."

Craig said "it wasn't much of a film and did nothing for anyone's career."

See also
 No Highway in the Sky

References

Notes

Citations

Bibliography

 Beaty, David. Cone of Silence. London: Pan Books, 1960.
 Jackson, A.J. Avro Aircraft since 1908. London: Putnam Aeronautical Books, 2000 (revised edition). .
 Paris, Michael. From the Wright Brothers to Top Gun: Aviation, Nationalism, and Popular Cinema. Manchester, UK: Manchester University Press, 1995. .
 Pendo, Stephen. Aviation in the Cinema. Lanham, Maryland: Scarecrow Press, 1985. .

External links
 
 
 
 
 Air-Britain Photographic Images: Avro 206 Ashton 3, WB493, Bristol Siddeley Engines

1960 films
British drama films
1960 drama films
British aviation films
British black-and-white films
Films directed by Charles Frend
Films set in London
Films set in India
Films based on British novels
1960s English-language films
1960s British films